Keshvinder Singh s/o Kashmir Singh is a Malaysian politician who served as Member of the Perak State Legislative Assembly (MLA) for Malim Nawar from March 2008 to May 2013. He was a member of the Democratic Action Party (DAP), then a component party of the Pakatan Rakyat (PR) and presently Pakatan Harapan (PH) opposition coalitions.

Politics

Offer to leave Pakatan Rakyat 
On 25 February 2010, he had lodged a report to the Malaysian Anti-Corruption Commission that he had received an offer of 20 million Ringgit Malaysia to leave Pakatan Rakyat.

Quitting DAP 
He was frustrated at the Pakatan Rakyat leadership in Perak as they were too political and quitted DAP.

Election result

References 

Democratic Action Party (Malaysia) politicians
Members of the Perak State Legislative Assembly
Malaysian people of Indian descent
Malaysian politicians of Indian descent
Living people
1972 births